The Ocetá Páramo (Spanish: Páramo de Ocetá) is a páramo, which means an ecosystem above the continuous forest line yet below the permanent snowline. It covers parts of the municipalities Monguí, Mongua and Tópaga, belonging to the Sugamuxi Province, Boyacá. The Ocetá Páramo is known for its collection of small shrubs called frailejones, as well as other Andean flora and fauna. Hiking tours from Monguí or Mongua to the páramo take a full day.

The Páramo de Ocetá in the times before the Spanish conquest of the Muisca was inhabited by the Muisca, loyal to the iraca of Suamox, who considered the region sacred. Myths and legends exist from pre-Columbian and Spanish colonial times and in the lower part of the páramo the Muisca women gave birth in little man-made pools (Tortolitas).

The Ocetá Páramo is considered the most beautiful páramo in the world and one of the treasures of Colombia.

Description 
The Ocetá Páramo is considered the most beautiful páramo in the world and one of the national treasures of Colombia. Colombia is the country with the most páramos in the world; more than 60% of the Andean ecosystem is found within Colombian territories. Boyacá is the department where 18.3% of the national total area is located.

Geography and climate 
The páramo with an area of  lies east of the Altiplano Cundiboyacense, southwest of the Pisba National Natural Park and north of Siscuinsí Lake. Farther to the northeast are the Sierra Nevada del Cocuy and to the southwest Lake Tota. Foggy blankets are common in the area.

Páramos are "sponges"; sources of water for lower lying terrains and the Ocetá Páramo is no exception. In the upper part of the páramo, marshes and small lakes exist. The biggest waterbody is the Laguna Negra and the Calicanto, Tejar and Morro Rivers as well as numerous creeks (quebradas) have their origin on the Páramo de Ocetá. The Penagos waterfall feeds the Laguna Negra.

Geology 
The Ocetá Páramo is part of the El Cocuy sub-basin, an inverted basin in the Eastern Ranges. During the Hauterivian, the El Cocuy and Tablazo sub-basins formed a continuous basin due to the flooding of the Santander-Floresta paleohigh. The main uplift in the Eastern Ranges occurred between the late Oligocene and Pleistocene, with increased tectonic uplift in the Plio-Pleistocene. The Neogene compression led to the formation of alluvial fans in the intermontane valleys of the Eastern Cordillera. Pollen analysis has shown the transition from lowland tropical forests to colder mountainous vegetation over the last 5 million years. The youngest uplifted eastern chain of the Colombian Andes formed the provenance area for the Magdalena River. In the vicinity of the area of Ocetá, to the southwest in Iza and Paipa for the Eastern Cordillera unique volcanic and magmatic activity is noted from 4.7 to 2.1 Ma.

The stratigraphical units encountered on the Ocetá Páramo are Paleocene sandstones and shales of the Socha Formation in the Peña de Ortí, and the Late Cretaceous Guadalupe sandstone and shale formations, Guaduas Formation, and the organic shales of the Chipaque Formation. The Guaduas Formation contains coal seams that are mined in the area. The Cretaceous-Paleocene Guaduas Formation is the most important source for the rich coal deposits in the Andean interior of Colombia.

During the Miocene, establishing the current ecosystem in the Pliocene, the vegetation became that of a páramo.

Flora 
The typical flora of a páramo are frailejones, that are plants of the genus Espeletia. The lower altitude parts of the páramo are characterised by Espeletia barclayana, Espeletia jaramilloi, Espeletia congestiflora and Espeletia argentea, while Espeletia grandiflora is growing in a wider altitude distribution. Chusquea tessellata is characteristic of the Eastern Ranges. On the Ocetá Páramo, formerly written as Oseta, various species have been described by Thomas van der Hammen; Bryum argenteum, Breutelia polygastrica, Calamagrostis effusa, Ceratodon stenocarpus, Didymodon laevigatus, Leptodontium flexifolium and Sphagnum sancto-josephense. Other flora occurring on the páramo are Pentacalia vernicosa, Ageratina tinifolia, Bidens andicola, Lupinus luisanae var. ocetensis, Viola sp., Arnica sp. and various types of mosses and lychen.

Fauna 
Among the fauna that can be observed on the páramo are Andean condor, black agouti, eastern cottontail, frogs, mountain paca, spectacled bear, white-tailed deer. The spectacled bear is very rare and possibly extinct. The white tailed deer, the main ingredient of the diet of the Muisca and pre-Muisca, has been extensively hunted and captured over time.

History 
The Páramo de Ocetá was a sacred place for the Muisca, who inhabited the Altiplano Cundiboyacense and surrounding areas before the Spanish conquest. The region of Monguí was populated by the Sanoa tribe.

Sights 
Along the route from Monguí to the highest point of the Ocetá Páramo, a series of sights are present. From most of the route, to the (south)west, a view of the Duitama-Sogamoso Valley, especially the settlements of Tibasosa, Nobsa and Duitama, is visible. From the Mirador de Cóndores and the Cerro de Águilas on clear days it is possible to see the snowy peaks of the Sierra Nevada del Cocuy and even the Llanos Orientales.

Tortolitas 
The Tortolitas (English: "Sweethearts") are oval-shaped depressions that were made by the Muisca. They served as "baths" where the Muisca women bore their babies. Close to the Tortolitas, Muisca petroglyphs have been found.

Peña de Otí 
The Peña de Otí (English: "Rock of Otí") is an outcrop of alternating shales and sandstones of the Socha Formation. It is observed to the southwest from the main trail leading to the Mirador de los Cóndores on the páramo. The rocks of the Peña de Otí were used to construct the churches and convent in Monguí. Legends about the Peña include tales of witches dancing with the devil on October 31, the origin of the scratches on the rock face from the devil who was riding a donkey on the hilltop and fell down, when the hoofs created the scratches and that the hill opened one day revealing the Calicanto Bridge and church made of gold. The end of the world would come when the hill closed again.

Caja del Rey 
Legend says it is a box of rock with a lid on top where the cacique Sanoha hid a fifteen-year-old girl inside, who during a night in April exited naked. The monolith contains an upper part where a natural fractured zone has been excavated more by humans. The rock is also a viewpoint for the western area.

Ciudad de Piedra 
In the Ciudad de Piedra, a tabular stone, thought to have served for human sacrifices, called Mesa de los Sacrificios is present.

El Pulpito del Diablo (English: "The Devil's Pulpit") is a raised mesa-type hill to the south of the main hiking trail on the Páramo de Ocetá.

Playa de los Frailejones 
The Playa or Valle de Frailejones or Jardines de Ocetá (English: "Frailejon Beach or Valley" or "Ocetá Gardens") is a relatively flat portion on the páramo where a large quantity of frailejones are growing. The frailejones grow  a year.

Cerro de Águilas 
The Cerro de Águilas (English: "Eagles Hill") is a hill on the páramo consisting of alternating shales and sandstone formations of the Guadalupe Group.

Mirador de Cóndores 
The Mirador de Cóndores (English: "Condor Viewpoint") is the highest point of the páramo and offers a view on the Laguna Negra. Andean condors can be sighted from this viewpoint.

Laguna Negra 
Laguna Negra (English: "Black Lake") is a permanent lake on the páramo that can be viewed from the Cerro de Águilas or the Mirador de Cóndores. The lake drains towards Mongua and it is possible to reach from that village. Legend tells that a young boy is living in the lake, whose singing can be heard close to the Penagos waterfall.

Tourism 
The Ocetá Páramo is mostly accessed from Monguí along the Camino de la Otra Vida; a full-day hike, ascending and back descending , that takes between six and eleven hours. A steep and pebbly access to the Ocetá Páramo is indicated with a gate called Portal de la Gloria. It is possible to access the páramo by horse and do wild camping on the páramo. The use of a trained guide is recommended, as the journey contains many paths and the sudden mist can be cold and dangerous due to the loss of orientation. The best months to visit the páramo are November and December.

An alternative route towards the Ocetá Páramo starts in Mongua and reaches the Laguna Negra first.

Named after Ocetá 
 A hotel in the town of Monguí
 A hotel in Tunja, the capital of Boyacá

See also 

Páramo
Sumapaz Páramo, Chingaza National Natural Park, Monguí
Muisca mythology, religion

References

Bibliography

External links 

  Páramo de Ocetá: le plus beau désert du monde

Páramos
Geography of Boyacá Department
Tourist attractions in Boyacá Department
Muisca and pre-Muisca sites